Hallstatt is a small town in the district of Gmunden, in the Austrian state of Upper Austria. Situated between the southwestern shore of Hallstätter See and the steep slopes of the Dachstein massif, the town lies in the Salzkammergut region, on the national road linking Salzburg and Graz.

Hallstatt is known for its production of salt, dating back to prehistoric times, and gave its name to the Hallstatt culture, the archaeological culture linked to Proto-Celtic and early Celtic people of the Early Iron Age in Europe, c. 800–450 BC.

Hallstatt is at the core of the Hallstatt-Dachstein/Salzkammergut Cultural Landscape declared as one of the World Heritage Sites in Austria by UNESCO in 1997. It is an area of overtourism.

History

Finds at Hallstatt extend from about 1200 BC until around 500 BC, and are divided by archaeologists into four phases:

Iron Age
In 1846, Johann Georg Ramsauer (1795–1874) discovered a large prehistoric cemetery at the Salzberg mines near Hallstatt, which he excavated during the second half of the 19th century. Eventually the excavation would yield 1,045 burials, although no settlement has yet been found. This may be covered by the later village, which has long occupied the entire narrow strip between the steep hillsides and the lake.

Some 1,300 burials have been found, including around 2,000 individuals, with women and children but few infants. Nor is there a "princely" burial, as often found near large settlements. Instead, there are a large number of burials varying considerably in the number and richness of the grave goods, but with a high proportion containing goods suggesting a life well above subsistence level. 

The community at Hallstatt exploited the salt mines in the area, which had been worked from time to time since the Neolithic period, from the 8th to 5th centuries BC. The style and decoration of the grave goods found in the cemetery are very distinctive, and artifacts made in this style are widespread in Europe. In the mine workings themselves, the salt has preserved many organic materials such as textiles, wood and leather, and many abandoned artefacts such as shoes, pieces of cloth, and tools including miner's backpacks, have survived in good condition.

Hallstatt A–B are part of the Bronze Age Urnfield culture. Phase A saw Villanovan influence. In this period, people were cremated and buried in simple graves. In phase B, tumulus (barrow or kurgan) burial becomes common, and cremation predominates. Little is known about this period in which the typical Celtic elements have not yet distinguished themselves from the earlier Villanova-culture. The "Hallstatt period" proper is restricted to HaC and HaD (8th to 5th centuries BC), corresponding to the early European Iron Age. Hallstatt lies in the area where the western and eastern zones of the Hallstatt culture meet, which is reflected in the finds from there. Hallstatt D is succeeded by the La Tène culture.

Hallstatt C is characterized by the first appearance of iron swords mixed amongst the bronze ones. Inhumation and cremation co-occur. For the final phase, Hallstatt D, daggers, almost to the exclusion of swords, are found in western zone graves ranging from c. 600–500 BC. There are also differences in the pottery and brooches. Burials were mostly inhumations. Halstatt D has been further divided into the sub-phases D1–D3, relating only to the western zone, and mainly based on the form of brooches.

Major activity at the site appears to have finished about 500 BC, for reasons that are unclear. Many Hallstatt graves were robbed, probably at this time. There was widespread disruption throughout the western Hallstatt zone, and the salt workings had by then become very deep. By then the focus of salt mining had shifted to the nearby Hallein Salt Mine, with graves at Dürrnberg nearby where there are significant finds from the late Hallstatt and early La Tène periods.

Much of the material from early excavations was dispersed, and is now found in many collections, especially German and Austrian museums, but the Hallstatt Museum in the town has the largest collection.

Romans onwards
There are no recorded notable events that took place in Hallstatt during Roman rule or the early Middle Ages. In 1311, the Hallstatt citizens were vested with market rights by Queen dowager Elizabeth, a sign that it had not lost its economic value. Today, apart from production of salt, which since 1595 has been transported 40 kilometres from Hallstatt to Ebensee via a brine pipeline, tourism plays a major factor in the town's economic life.

Tourists are told that Hallstatt is the site of "the world's oldest pipeline", which was constructed 400 years ago from 13,000 hollowed-out trees. There is so little space for cemeteries that every ten years bones used to be exhumed and removed into an ossuary, to make room for new burials. A collection of elaborately decorated skulls with the deceased's name, profession, date of death inscribed on them is on display at the local chapel.

19th century

Until the late 19th century, it was only possible to reach Hallstatt by boat or via narrow trails. The land between the lake and mountains was sparse, and the town itself exhausted every free patch of it. Access between houses on the river bank was by boat or over the upper path, a small corridor passing through attics. The first road to Hallstatt was only built in 1890, along the west shore, partially by rock blasting. Nevertheless, this secluded and inhospitable landscape counts as one of the first places of human settlement due to the rich sources of natural salt, which have been mined for thousands of years, originally in the shape of hearts owing to the use of antler picks.

Some of Hallstatt's oldest archaeological finds, such as a shoe-last celt, date back to around 5500 BC. In 1846 Johann Georg Ramsauer discovered a large prehistoric cemetery near the current location of Hallstatt. Ramsauer's work at the Hallstatt cemeteries continued until 1863, unearthing more than 1000 burials. It is to his credit and to the enormous benefit of archaeology that he proceeded to excavate each one with the same slow, methodical care as the first. His methods included measuring and drawing each find. In an age before colour photography, he produced very detailed watercolours of each assemblage before it was removed from the ground.

In the history of archaeology, Ramsauer's work at Hallstatt helped usher in a new, more systematic way of doing archaeology. In addition, one of the first blacksmith sites was excavated there. Active trade, and thus wealth, allowed for the development of a highly developed culture, which, after findings in the Salzberghochtal, was named the Hallstatt culture. This lasted from approximately 800 to 500 BC.

Halstatt Salt Mine
The Hallstatt salt mine is the world's oldest working salt mine.  The mine is located within the Upper Permian to Lower Triassic Haselgebirge Formation of the Northern Limestone Alps.  The Hallstatt salt mine comprises 21 levels and several smaller shafts ranging from 514 m above sea level (Erbstollen level) to an elevation of around 1267 m (Erzherzog Matthias Schurf level).

Tourism

The problems and opportunities of greatly-increased tourism in Hallstatt were covered by The Washington Post in August 2019. Halstatt's tourism began in the 19th century but greatly increased after it was named a UNESCO World Heritage Site in 1997. It became popular among East Asian tourists in 2006 when it was featured on a South Korean television show. 

Social media images of Hallstatt, captioned "the most Instagrammable town in the world," went viral in Southeast Asia. A replica was planned and then built in China in 2011 in Huizhou, Guangdong province, Hallstatt's twin town. In 2013 it was rumored in China to be the model for the movie Frozens Arendelle village. By 2017 local churches were employing bouncers to prevent services being disrupted by tourists. In 2020 the town had a population of 780, and estimates of 10,000 to nearly 30,000 tourists per day, primarily via bus tours which bring tourists briefly into the town for photo opportunities, then quickly move on. 

Hallstatt's economy depends on tourism, but according to locals the day-visitors drive away tourists who would stay longer. Hallstatt became the prime example of overtourism in Austria and led to controversies around limiting the number of tourists. The Austrian Public Broadcasting Organization made multiple documentaries about the situation. 

The town in 2020 focused on "quality" tourism. From fall 2020 there will be assigned time slots for tour buses to cope with the problem. The arrivals will be limited to 54 per day, which is about half of the current number. Buses with an overnight booking in the town will receive preference.

Politics
Seats in the municipal assembly (Gemeinderat) as of 2015 local elections:

 Social Democratic Party of Austria (SPÖ): 7
 BFH (Independent): 4
 Austrian People's Party (ÖVP): 2

Alexander Scheutz (SPÖ) has been mayor of Hallstatt since 2009.

International relations

Twin towns—sister cities

Hallstatt is twinned with:

  Huizhou, China

Replica

On 16 June 2011, plans to build a replica in China were first reported. On 2 June 2012, it was reported that Chinese mining company China Minmetals Corporation built a full-scale replica of the entire town in Huizhou, Guangdong province.

Climate
Hallstatt has an oceanic climate (Cfb) with warm, rainy summers and cold, snowy winters. Precipitation is plentiful year round but is at its highest during the three months of summer.

See also 
List of World Heritage Sites in Austria

References

External links 

 Municipal website
 Hallstatt tourism site 
 Images of Hallstatt 
 Hallstatt Beinhaus Random-Times.com
 ; episode 282 of Terra Mater
 

Archaeological type sites
Cities and towns in Gmunden District
Tourist attractions in Upper Austria
World Heritage Sites in Austria
Iron Age Europe